Luke Harry Chadwick (born 18 November 1980) is an English former professional footballer who played as a midfielder.

Chadwick began his career at Manchester United where he made 25 Premier League appearances in four seasons. While at Old Trafford he spent time out on loan at Reading and Burnley before joining West Ham United on a permanent basis in the summer of 2004. 

A year later, he joined Stoke City on loan before making the move permanent in January 2006. He remained at Stoke until November 2006 making 55 appearances before joining Norwich City. Injuries restricted his time at Carrow Road and he moved to Milton Keynes Dons in October 2008. In March 2014, Chadwick joined Cambridge United, the club he supported as a child. He was released at the end of the 2014–15 season.

Club career

Manchester United
Born in Cambridge, Chadwick had a three-week trial at his favourite club Cambridge United at the age of 10. After a spell at Arsenal, he was signed to the  Manchester United youth system. He made his professional debut on 13 October 1999 in the third round of the League Cup as a young United side lost 3–0 at Aston Villa. After loans at Royal Antwerp in Belgium, he made his Premier League debut on 11 November 2000 in a 2–1 home win over Middlesbrough as an added-time substitute for Dwight Yorke. On 17 December, he came on in the 80th minute for Dennis Irwin at home to Liverpool and was sent off for a foul on Vladimír Šmicer in a 1–0 loss. He scored two league goals in the title-winning 2000–01 season, one in a 3–0 win at Bradford City on 13 January 2001 and the other on 3 March in a 1–1 draw at Leeds United.

After playing rarely for United in 18 months, Chadwick went on a one-month loan to First Division team Reading in February 2003. He was inspired by Arsenal's Matthew Upson increasing his standing by making the same move. On his debut for the Royals on 10 February, he equalised in a 2–1 home win over Gillingham. His deal was extended until the end of the season. He helped the club to the play-off semi-finals, where they were ousted by eventually promoted Wolverhampton Wanderers.

In July 2003, Chadwick was loaned for the season to First Division side Burnley. He missed pre-season due to two jaw operations as part of a two-year treatment. In 40 total games he scored six goals, including two in a 4–0 win over Bradford on 20 September; after that game, he conceded that he may have to leave United.

West Ham United
On 2 August 2004, Chadwick moved to West Ham United of the newly renamed Championship on a free transfer. He was signed by Alan Pardew, who had led him at Reading. In his only season, he scored a goal on 10 December to open a 1–1 home draw with Leeds.

Stoke City
Chadwick joined Stoke City on loan at the start of the 2005–06 season. On 4 January 2006, the transfer was made permanent for a fee of £100,000, on a deal lasting until the summer of 2008 with the option of one more year.

In the season opener away to Southend United on 6 August 2006, Chadwick was carried off after collapsing. It was confirmed that he was suffering only from dehydration.

Norwich City
On 13 November 2006, Chadwick signed on loan for Norwich City until 3 January; he was signed by Peter Grant, who had worked with him at Reading and West Ham. On his debut six days later, he opened the scoring in a 3–1 loss at rivals Ipswich Town. He suffered a knee injury in that match, ruling him out until March. After his loan ended, he signed a 2-year deal for a 200,000 fee. He said that his transfer was due to his wife and children returning to Cambridge.

His injury problems continued into the following season as he struggled for fitness.

Milton Keynes Dons
On 1 October 2008, Chadwick was loaned to League One club Milton Keynes Dons for three months. He scored three goals in the eight games of his loan, including a brace on 28 October in a 2–1 win at Leyton Orient. He returned to Norwich in the middle of November due to a knee injury. He moved permanently on a 2-year deal at the turn of the year, on a free transfer.

Chadwick was MK Dons' Player of the Season for 2009–10 and 2010–11, with the latter season ending in a 4–3 aggregate elimination in the playoff semi-finals by Peterborough United. In March 2011, his contract was extended by two more years.  On 23 August that year, he scored twice in a 4–0 win at former club Norwich in the League Cup second round. A year and five days later, he did the same at the same stage in a 2–1 home win over Blackburn Rovers.

In March 2013, Chadwick signed a further two-year extension to his MK Dons deal.

Cambridge United
On 18 March 2014 Chadwick joined his hometown club Cambridge United on loan. He made his debut the same day in a 2–1 home win against Welling United in the Conference National. He signed permanently on 7 June, after the team won promotion in the play-off final against Gateshead. 

In 2014–15, Chadwick played a part in Cambridge's run in the FA Cup, scoring in their 2–2 home draw with Mansfield Town in the second round. In the fourth round against his former club Manchester United, he played in a goalless home draw and a 3–0 replay loss on his return to Old Trafford; both sets of fans gave him a standing ovation when he was substituted in the latter game. At the end of the season he was released.

Soham Town Rangers and move into coaching
After leaving Cambridge United, Chadwick signed for Isthmian League Division One North side Soham Town Rangers in November 2015. He spent one season at Soham before returning to Cambridge as a full-time coach in the club's academy.

International career
Chadwick made his debut for the England under-21s in the win against Luxembourg in September 1999. He played the full 90 minutes as England won 5−0 in the 2000 UEFA European Under-21 Championship qualifier at the Madejski Stadium. England qualified for the finals in Slovakia and Chadwick made substitute appearances against Italy and Slovakia as they were eliminated at the group stages. He featured four times during England's qualifying campaign for 2002 UEFA European Under-21 Championship with his last appearance coming in the 5−0 win against Albania on 4 September 2001. Overall, Chadwick made 13 appearances for the U21s but scored no goals.

Personal life
Chadwick and his wife Hayley have two sons. As of 2015, both were in the youth ranks of Cambridge United.

In May 2020, Chadwick spoke about how his mental health had been affected by abuse about his appearance he had received as a young player. He highlighted how the media had made fun of his appearance, "spots on my face, teeth sticking out, that sort of thing", making particular mention of the abuse he had received on the BBC panel show, They Think It's All Over. He received an apology from the show's hosts Nick Hancock and Gary Lineker.

Career statistics

Honours
Royal Antwerp
Belgian Second Division: 1999–2000

Manchester United
Premier League: 2000–01

Cambridge United
Conference Premier play-offs: 2013–14

Individual
Milton Keynes Dons Player of the Year: 2009–10, 2010–11

References

External links

Luke Chadwick at ManUtd.com

1980 births
Living people
Sportspeople from Cambridge
Footballers from Cambridgeshire
English footballers
English expatriate footballers
England youth international footballers
England under-21 international footballers
Association football midfielders
Manchester United F.C. players
Royal Antwerp F.C. players
Reading F.C. players
Burnley F.C. players
West Ham United F.C. players
Stoke City F.C. players
Norwich City F.C. players
Milton Keynes Dons F.C. players
Cambridge United F.C. players
Soham Town Rangers F.C. players
Premier League players
English Football League players
National League (English football) players
Isthmian League players
Belgian Pro League players
Challenger Pro League players
Expatriate footballers in Belgium
English expatriate sportspeople in Belgium
Association football coaches
Cambridge United F.C. non-playing staff